Markowy Wygon  is a village in the administrative district of Gmina Szudziałowo, within Sokółka County, Podlaskie Voivodeship, in north-eastern Poland, close to the border with Belarus.

The village has a population of 11.

References

Markowy Wygon